A content delivery platform (CDP) is a software as a service (SaaS) content service, similar to a content management system (CMS), that utilizes embedded software code to deliver web content. Instead of the installation of software on client servers, a CDP feeds content through embedded code snippets, typically via JavaScript widget, Flash widget or server-side Ajax.

Content delivery platforms are not content delivery networks, which are utilized for large web media and do not depend on embedded software code. A CDP is utilized for all types of web content, even text-based content.

Alternatively, a content delivery platform can be utilized to import a variety of syndicated content into one central location and then re-purposed for web syndication. 

The term content delivery platform was coined by Feed.Us software architect John Welborn during a presentation to the Chicago Web Developers Association.

In late 2007, two blog comment services launched utilizing CDP-based services. Intense Debate and Disqus both employ JavaScript widgets to display and collect blog comments on websites.

See also
 Web content management system
 Viddler, YouTube, Ustream embeddable streaming video

References

Notable Content delivery platforms 

Computer networking
Content management systems
Website management